The 2011 Atlantic Sun Conference men's soccer tournament was the 2011 edition of the tournament, which determines the men's college soccer champion of the Atlantic Sun Conference, as well as the conference's automatic berth into the 2011 NCAA Division I Men's Soccer Championship. The tournament began in mid-November and was won by the Florida Gulf Coast Eagles.

Regular season standings

Bracket

Schedule 
Higher seed is listed on the right.

First round

Semifinals

Atlantic Sun Championship

See also 
 Atlantic Sun Conference
 2011 Atlantic Sun Conference men's soccer season
 2011 in American soccer
 2011 NCAA Division I Men's Soccer Championship
 2011 NCAA Division I men's soccer season

References 

-
2011
Atlantic Sun Conference Men's Soccer Tournament
Atlantic Sun Conference Men's Soccer Tournament